The 1990 African Championships in Athletics were held in Cairo, Egypt between 3 and 6 October.

Medal summary

Men's events

Women's events

Medal table

See also
1990 in athletics (track and field)

External links
Results – GBR Athletics

A
African Championships in Athletics
International athletics competitions hosted by Egypt
African
African Championships in Athletics
1990s in Cairo
Sports competitions in Cairo
Athletics in Cairo